The Convention of Alkmaar was a 18 October 1799 agreement concluded between the commanders of the expeditionary forces of Great Britain and Russia on the one hand, and of those of the First French Republic and the Batavian Republic on the other, in the Dutch city of Alkmaar, by which the British and Russians agreed to withdraw their forces from the Batavian Republic following the failed Anglo-Russian invasion of Holland. The Russian and British forces under the Duke of York were transported back to Britain in the weeks after the Convention was signed.

Text

References

Sources
 Harvey, Robert. War of Wars: The Epic Struggle Between Britain and France 1789–1815. London, 2007
 , British minor expeditions: 1746 to 1814. HMSO, 1884 
  (1832) Geschiedkundige Beschouwing van den Oorlog op het grondgebied der Bataafsche Republiek in 1799. J.C. Vieweg 
 Urban, Mark. Generals: Ten British Commanders Who Shaped the World. Faber and Faber, 2005.

Campaigns of the French Revolutionary Wars
Military history of the Netherlands
Diplomatic conferences in the Netherlands
Alkmaar
Alkmaar
Alkmaar
Alkmaar
Alkmaar
Alkmaar
1799 in the Batavian Republic
1799 in France
1799 in Great Britain
1799 in the Russian Empire